Noordwijk is a town and municipality in the west of the Netherlands, in the province of South Holland.

On 1 January 2019, the former municipality of Noordwijkerhout became part of Noordwijk.

Besides its beaches, Noordwijk is also known for its bulb flower fields. It is located in an area called the "Dune and Bulb Region" (Duin- en Bollenstreek).

Noordwijk is also the location of the headquarters for the European Space Research and Technology Centre (ESTEC), part of the European Space Agency (ESA). ESA's visitors' centre Space Expo is a permanent space exhibition.

Noordwijk facts

  coast line
  from Amsterdam
  from Schiphol airport
  from The Hague
  from Rotterdam Airport
 14 camp sites in the region
 ± 1 million overnight stays per year
 Number of hotels/B&B beds: ± 3,400
 No. 2 congress destination in the Netherlands
 ± 251 international congresses per year
 Home to the ESA/ESTEC (European Space Research and Technology Centre)
 In 2012 Noordwijk has received the QualityCoast Gold Award for its efforts to become a sustainable tourism destination. Because of this award Noordwijk has been selected for inclusion in the global atlas for sustainable tourism DestiNet.

Communities
The municipality of Noordwijk consists of the communities Noordwijk aan Zee and Noordwijk-Binnen, separated by a narrow green belt, as well as Noordwijkerhout and De Zilk.

Noordwijk aan Zee

Noordwijk aan Zee was founded around 1200 as a fishing village. Until the beginning of the 19th century, fishing remained its primary business, but then began to be replaced by the growing tourism industry. Nowadays because of its long sandy beaches, it is a popular resort town with 1,000,000 overnight stays per year.
It has a lighthouse & a KNRM rescue station. Furthermore, it has a reformed church (1647) with a pulpit from the 17th century.

Noordwijk aan Zee is rated as the 12th richest location in the Netherlands.

A small part of the indigenous population of Noordwijk aan Zee speaks Noordwijks, a very original Dutch dialect, which sounds like Katwijks, but in Noordwijk the dialect is almost gone, compared to Katwijk, where more people speak in (partly) dialect.

Noordwijk-Binnen

Because of the martyrdom of Priest Jeroen in 857, the Archbishop of Utrecht made Noordwijk-Binnen a pilgrimage location in 1429. Both the Catholic and Protestant churches here are named after this priest.

Noordwijk-Binnen has retained its historic character and is therefore protected by the Dutch Monument Law. An interesting historic view is shown by the picture of Gerard van der Laan with the view to the Jeroenskerk. In the foreground is a canal with two sailboats for inland waterways.

The area around Noordwijk-Binnen has long been an important part of the regional bulb flower industry. The dunes were dug out and transformed into fields for the cultivation of bulb flowers.
The territory of Noordwijk still consists mostly of geest. The bulb region is formed of Noordwijk together with surrounding municipalities.

Noordwijkerhout

Nature
North (and to a lesser extent south) of Noordwijk spreads a relatively vast dune area, in which a varied wild flora and fauna (with among others pine forests and deer) is observable for bikers, walkers and gallopers. North of Noordwijk, large areas of dunes are covered by the natura 2000 act. Part of which holds house to the Kennemer Zweefvlieg Club.

Personalities and public figures in Noordwijk

Public figures who lived in Noordwijk or sought recovery were Thomas Mann, Maria Montessori (buried in Noordwijk) among others, the entrepreneur Alfred Heineken, ex-Empress Soraya, the poet Henriette Roland Holst, the psychoanalyst Sigmund Freud, the writer Stefan George, the pianist Pia Beck, the tenor Jacques Urlus, the writer Margriet de Moor as well as painters and artists such as Marinus Gidding, Gerard van der Laan, Max Liebermann, Daniël Noteboom, Jan Hillebrand Wijsmuller and known film actors.

The landscape painter Ludolph Berkemeier (buried in Noordwijk) moved in 1896 to Noordwijk. His paintings are in the style of the Hague School.

Noordwijk is also home of football coach Louis van Gaal.

In March 2014, the US President Barack Obama and General Secretary of the Chinese Communist Party Xi Jinping stayed in Noordwijk

Part of Martin Ritt's adaptation of John le Carre's The Spy Who Came in from the Cold (1965), starring Richard Burton, was filmed at Koningin Astrid Boulevard in Noordwijk. This is where Burton's character Alec Leamas is taken for initial interrogation after appearing to defect to the East.

Notable people
 Janus Dousa (1545–1604) Lord of Noordwyck, a Dutch statesman, jurist, historian, poet and philologist 
 Petrus Jacobus Runckel (1822 in Noordwijk-Binnen – 1860) a Dutch colonial government official in the Dutch Gold Coast 
 Henriette Roland Holst (1869–1952) a Dutch poet and council communist, Nobel Prize in Literature nominee
 Freddy Heineken (1923 – 2002 in Noordwijk) a Dutch businessman for Heineken International
 Lodewijk Woltjer (1930–2019) an astronomer
 Margriet de Moor (born 1941) a Dutch pianist and writer of novels and essays
 Leendert van Utrecht (born 1969) a retired Dutch footballer with 300 club caps
 Joris Putman (born 1984) a Dutch actor
 Janieck Devy (born 1994) a Dutch singer-songwriter, musician and actor

World War II bunker complex

Just north of Noordwijk, buried in the North Sea dunes, lies one of the biggest and most extensive bunker complexes in the Netherlands of the World War II Atlantic Wall defenses, constructed under Nazi Germany occupation. Some 80 bunkers and underground structures housed 180 soldiers, and were connected by 400 metres (a quarter-mile) of tunnels, equipped with narrow rail-tracks for moving heavy ammunition. Four heavy gun bunkers housed 155mm cannons and doubled as living quarters. Two other large bunkers stored ammunition.

The fire control bunker offered an excellent view of the coastal sea, used for observation and ballistic trajectory calculation, to control the entire gun battery. In 2001, the central command bunker was reopened as a museum, refitted with mostly original equipment. Because the Germans kept the men busy building further bunkers, pill-boxes, etc., by war's end the complex counted almost one underground structure for every two men.

Museum of Comic Art, Noordwijk
 Since 2021 Noordwijk has its own comics museum, the MoCA, or Museum of Comic Art, Noordwijk.

See also
 Noordwijk Conference of 6 September 1955

Gallery

References

Bibliography
 Noordwijk: Webster's Timeline History, 1398–2007, by Icon Group International, 2010, ASIN B0062YIAYR.
 E.W. Petrejus: De Bomschuit, een verdwenen scheepstype, 1954, Museum voor Land- en Volkerkunde enhet Maritiern Museum "Prins Hendrik", Nr. 2.
 Norma Broude (1990): World Impressionism: The International Movement — 1860–1920, Harry N. Abrams, inc. . 
 Ronald de Leeuw, John Sillevis, Charles Dumas (1983): The Hague School, Dutch Masters of the 19th Century. — Exhibition-Catalogue, Weidenfeld and Nicolson, London, .
 Terry van Druten, Maite van Dijk, John Silveris: De aquarel – Nederlandse meesters van de negentiende eeuw. THOT, Teylers Museum und De Mesdag Collectie, Bussum 2015, .
 Willem Bastian Tholen: Hollandsche Teekenmaatschappij. Den Haag 1914.

Further reading
Stichting Geschiedsschrijving Noordwijk: Noordwijk. Aan Zee en op de geest. En nieuwe geschiedenis van Noordwijk. Noordwijk 2011

External links 

 
 Tourist Information About Noordwijk
 Noordwijk Atlantik Wall Museum

 
Municipalities of South Holland
Populated coastal places in the Netherlands
Populated places in South Holland
Seaside resorts in the Netherlands